St Ive Cross is a hamlet east of St Ive in east Cornwall, England, United Kingdom.

References

Hamlets in Cornwall